The 1987 Philadelphia Eagles season was their 55th in the National Football League (NFL). Despite the interruption of the schedule by the second strike in six seasons, the team improved upon its previous output of 5–10–1, going 7–8. However, three of those losses came during the three-game stretch during the strike when teams were staffed primarily with replacement players, or "scabs," who crossed the picket lines to suit up. Despite the improvement, the team once again failed to qualify for the playoffs.

Defensive lineman Reggie White nonetheless had a breakout season, establishing a new NFL record by exploding for 21 sacks in only 12 games.

On October 25 at Veterans Stadium, in the first game back after the strike was settled, Eagles head coach Buddy Ryan called for the infamous "fake kneel" in the final seconds with the hosts leading the Dallas Cowboys by 10 points. The fake eventually led to another late touchdown, payback for Cowboys head coach Tom Landry running up the score with starters who crossed the picket line to play two weeks earlier at Texas Stadium. One week later, Philadelphia won its final road game against the Cardinals at the old Busch Stadium, before the franchise moved to Phoenix for the 1988 season.

Offseason

NFL draft 
The 1987 NFL draft was the procedure by which National Football League teams selected amateur college football players. The draft was held April 28–29, 1987, in New York City. This again would be a 12-round draft of 28 teams. The Philadelphia Eagles would get the 9th in the 12 rounds. They would make 10 selections in the draft.

The table shows the Eagles selections and what picks they had that were traded away and the team that ended up with that pick. It is possible the Eagles' pick ended up with this team via another team that the Eagles made a trade with.
Not shown are acquired picks that the Eagles traded away.

NFL supplemental draft 
The Eagles would also use a pick in the 1987 NFL Supplemental Draft to take Cris Carter a wide receiver out of Ohio State. Prior to Carter's senior season in 1987, he secretly signed with notorious sports agent Norby Walters. When the contract was discovered, Carter was ruled ineligible to play for Ohio State.

Personnel

Staff

NFL replacement players 
After the league decided to use replacement players during the NFLPA strike, the following team was assembled:

Roster

Regular season 
In 1987, Mike Quick was part of NFL history. He finished second in the NFL in touchdown receptions with 11. The leader was Jerry Rice with 23. This marked the first time in NFL history that a category leader doubled the total of his nearest competitor.

Schedule 

Note: Intra-division opponents are in bold text.

Games summaries

Week 1 
Sunday, September 13, 1987 Kickoff 1:00 pm Eastern

Played at Robert F. Kennedy Memorial Stadium on grass playing surface in 74F degrees with wind at 11 MPH.

Week 2 
Sunday, September 20, 1987 Kickoff 1:00 pm Eastern

Played at Veterans Stadium on an Astroturf playing surface in 62F degrees with wind at 12 MPH.

Week Canceled 

Because of the NFLPA union's players strike against the NFL, all the games this week were cancelled. Replacement players were used when the season resumed the following week.

The Eagles would have traveled to Candlestick Park to face the host 49ers in what would have been Buddy Ryan's only trip to the Bay Area as the Eagles' head coach. The Eagles sought their second win in San Francisco since 1983 (and also since the AFL-NFL merger). Ryan's Eagles did meet the 49ers once, losing at Veterans Stadium in 1989. The Eagles did not travel to San Francisco until 1992, nor did they win in San Francisco until the final night of the 1993 season.

Week 3 
Sunday, October 4, 1987 Kickoff 1:00 PM Eastern

Played at Veterans Stadium on an Astroturf playing surface; 48 degrees with wind at 19 MPH. This was the first game of the season with replacement players. The announced attendance was 4,074, the smallest crowd at an NFL contest in almost 40 years (since October 30, 1949, when 3,678 people attended a Washington Redskins-New York Bulldogs game at the Polo Grounds).

Week 4 
Sunday, October 11, 1987 Kickoff 12:00 pm Central

Played at Texas Stadium on a grass playing surface in 58F degrees with wind at 16 MPH. Played with replacement players.

Week 5 
Sunday, October 18, 1987 Kickoff 12:00 pm Central

Played at Lambeau Field on a grass playing surface in 46F degrees with wind at 11 MPH. Played with replacement players.

Week 6 
Sunday October 25, 1987 Kickoff 1:00 pm Eastern

Played at Veterans Stadium on an Astroturf playing surface in 56F degrees with wind at 15 MPH. This was the first week the Eagles played after the NFLPA strike ended.

This was the revenge game for Week 4, where the Cowboys ran up the score against an Eagles replacement squad. Despite the game being effectively over, with the Eagles leading and having possession of the ball, the Eagles performed a fake kneel into a pass. Pass interference was called, and the Eagles successfully scored from the 1-yard line on the next play as time expired.

Week 7 
Sunday, November 1, 1987 Kickoff 12:00 pm Central

Played at Busch Stadium on an AstroTurf playing surface in 68F degrees with wind at 10 MPH.

Week 8 
Sunday, November 8, 1987 Kickoff 1:00 pm Eastern

Played at Veterans Stadium on an Astroturf playing surface in 52F degrees with wind at 10 MPH.

Week 9 
Sunday, November 15, 1987 Kickoff 4:00 pm Eastern

Played at Veterans Stadium on an Astroturf playing surface in 50F degrees with wind at 8 MPH.

Week 10 
Sunday, November 22, 1987 Kickoff 1:00 pm Eastern

Week 11 
November 29, 1987 Kickoff 1:00 pm Eastern

Played at Sullivan Stadium on an AstroTurf playing surface in 38F degrees with wind at 11 MPH.

Week 12 
December 6, 1987 Stadium Kickoff 1:00 pm Eastern

Played at The Meadowlands on an AstroTurf playing surface in 38F degrees with wind at 22 MPH and a wind chill of 27F.

Week 13 
Sunday, December 13, 1987 Kickoff 1:00 pm Eastern

Played at Veterans Stadium on an Astroturf playing surface in 43F degrees with wind at 15 MPH.

Week 14 
Sunday, December 20, 1987 Kickoff 1:00 pm Eastern

Played at The Meadowlands on an Astroturf playing surface in 42F degrees with wind at 11 MPH.

Week 15 
Sunday, December 27, 1987 Kickoff 1:00 pm Eastern

Played at Veterans Stadium on an Astroturf playing surface in 35F degrees with wind at 10 MPH with a wind chill of 28.

Standings

Awards and honors 
 Mike Quick, 1987 Pro Bowl selection

References

External links 
 1987 Philadelphia Eagles at Pro-Football-Reference.com

Philadelphia Eagles seasons
Philadelphia Eagles
Philadelphia Eagles